Michael Patrick Bolewski (1888–1974) was a pioneering Australian international representative rugby league footballer who played in the 1900s and 1910s. He, along with his three brothers, Henry, Alec and Walter, became a pioneering Queensland representative player as well.

From a Polish family, Bolewski was playing rugby union in 1908 when selected to play for Country Queensland in their victory against Metropolitan Brisbane. Bolewski was then included in the first Queensland rugby league team formed to play against New South Wales, travelling down to Sydney for all three of the first series of interstate rugby league matches in Australia. He was then selected to go on the 1908–09 Kangaroo tour of Great Britain, the first ever such tour, and with teammate Bill Heidke became the first Bundaberg locals to represent Australia. Bolewski played in all three matches of the first Ashes series for Australia against Great Britain. He stayed in England after the tour to play for Leigh (Heritage № 188). In 1909 Bolewski started a three-season stint with the club. Also that year he played for Australia when they hosted the visiting New Zealand national rugby league team. Bolweski became the first overseas player to play 100 games for Leigh and reappeared in their A team after several seasons' break.

References

External links

1888 births
1974 deaths
Australia national rugby league team players
Australian people of Polish descent
Australian rugby union players
Australian rugby league players
Leigh Leopards players
Queensland rugby league team players
Rugby league fullbacks
Rugby league players from Ballina, New South Wales